Fyodorovsky (masculine), Fyodorovskaya (feminine), or Fyodorovskoye (neuter), may refer to:
Fyodor Fedorovsky (1883-1955), Soviet stage designer
Fyodorovsky District, name of several districts in Russia
Fyodorovsky (inhabited locality) (Fyodorovskaya, Fyodorovskoye), name of several inhabited localities in Russia